Zbigniew Fedyczak (born 26 August 1952) is a Polish former sports shooter. He competed in two events at the 1972 Summer Olympics.

References

1952 births
Living people
Polish male sport shooters
Olympic shooters of Poland
Shooters at the 1972 Summer Olympics
People from Zielona Góra